Charrey-sur-Saône (literally Charrey on Saône) is a commune in the Côte-d'Or department in eastern France.

In October 2016, Charrey-sur-Saône hit the international headlines as one of the first Côte-d'Or villages to be used for the disbursement of refugees and economic migrants from the Calais Jungle.

Population

See also
Communes of the Côte-d'Or department

References

Communes of Côte-d'Or
Côte-d'Or communes articles needing translation from French Wikipedia